Hosono may refer to
Hosono (surname)
Hosono House, solo album by Haruomi Hosono
Hosono Station, a railway station in Matsukawa, Nagano Prefecture, Japan
Kita-Hosono Station, a railway station in Matsukawa, Nagano Prefecture, Japan
Hōsono Station, a railway station in Seika, Kyoto Prefecture, Japan
Shin-Hōsono Station, a railway station in Seika, Kyoto Prefecture, Japan